Upstream and downstream can refer to:

Molecular biology
Upstream and downstream (DNA), determining relative positions on DNA
Upstream and downstream (transduction) determining temporal and mechanistic order of cellular and molecular events of signal transduction

See also 
 Upstream (disambiguation)
 Downstream (disambiguation)